The Shari Lewis Show is a children's television program that first appeared on NBC Saturday mornings from 1960 to 1963.

Premise
The show starred Shari Lewis, who was both the show's host and the puppeteer for the characters Lamb Chop, Hush Puppy, and Charlie Horse. The show also starred Ronald Radd, who played Mr. Goodfellow and Clive Russell, who made his television debut on the series. Fred Gwynne also made appearances as Lamb Chop's doctor.  Lamb Chop made her debut on Captain Kangaroo in 1956. The show was awarded a Peabody Award in 1961. Despite warm reviews, the show was cancelled after three seasons.

NBC series
The NBC series premiered on 1 October 1960 as part of NBC's Saturday morning lineup, which replaced Howdy Doody.  The show ran until 28 September 1963.

BBC series
In 1968, the BBC picked up the series, broadcasting from 13 April 1968 to 28 August 1976. The series was picked up at a time when the BBC was experimenting with using American performers in light entertainment.

Archive
Almost no full episodes of the NBC show are known to exist today. The original tapes of many episodes were wiped and reused by NBC to record coverage of the 1964 Democratic and Republican national conventions. Lewis said in an interview decades later that this "was a shame, since the shows were beautifully done as a showcase of NBC's early color broadcast work." However, some episodes and some clips of the show have survived, and the existing footage was restored by the UCLA Film and Television Archive, and some episodes are available on DVD.

The same fate has befallen the BBC series, but a few episodes are known to exist.

References

External links
 The Shari Lewis Show on the Internet Movie Database

1960s American children's television series
1960 American television series debuts
1963 American television series endings
NBC original programming
Television series by Universal Television
Peabody Award-winning television programs
American television shows featuring puppetry
English-language television shows
BBC children's television shows